The Duncan Toys Company is an American toy manufacturer based in Middlefield, Ohio best known for its line of yo-yos. The company was founded in 1929 by Donald F. Duncan Sr. and purchased the Flores Yo-Yo Company from Pedro Flores, who brought the yo-yo to the United States from the Philippines. Duncan popularized the yo-yo through competitions that spread throughout the country, publicized in his publications by William Randolph Hearst in exchange for a requirement that contestants had to sell subscriptions to Hearst newspapers as a condition of entry. In 1965, a federal court ruled that Duncan did not have exclusive rights to the word "yo-yo" because the word had become a part of common speech. In 1968, Duncan Toys became a division of Flambeau.

In 2017, the makers of Rubik's Cube sued Duncan Toys Company over their "Quick Cube," alleging that the toy “mimics the features and overall appearance’’ of the Rubik's Cube puzzle.

Yo-yo product line 
 The Imperial is the classic model that made Duncan yo-yos famous; a fixed-axle plastic yo-yo in a traditional silhouette.  The Imperial is the "starter yo-yo" in the Duncan line (launched in 1954).
 The Sonic Satellite is one of the first duncan yo-yos like the imperial, but this one has a rounder shape and glows in the dark.
 The Butterfly is nearly as old as the Imperial, a fixed-axle plastic yo-yo in a butterfly silhouette. The Butterfly is another "starter yo-yo" in the Duncan line (launched in 1954).
 The BumbleBee is a plastic ball-bearing transaxle yo-yo with a modified silhouette.  The Bumblebee has a take-apart construction and removable endcaps. This design was acquired when Duncan bought Playmaxx and it was originally sold as the Turbo Bumblebee.
 The Dragonfly is the same as the BumbleBee, but in a butterfly silhouette. Another Playmaxx design, it was originally sold under the name, Turbo Bumblebee GT.
 The Speed Beetle is a plastic take-apart yo-yo in a traditional silhouette, designed for looping. It has a ball-bearing transaxle in a take-apart design with adjustable gap and extra spacers.
 The ProYo is a plastic take-apart yo-yo in a modified silhouette. With a fixed wooden axle and removable end-caps, the ProYo is designed for intermediate looping play. Formerly manufactured by the Playmaxx/ProYo Company.
 The ProFire is a plastic transaxle yo-yo with removable endcaps in a modified silhouette. Unlike other transaxles, the ProFire has a brass sleeve rotating around the axle. Formerly known as the Playmaxx ProFire, it was designed to excel at looping.
 The ProFly is the same as the ProYo, but in a butterfly silhouette
 The Mosquito is an undersized plastic take-apart ball-bearing yo-yo, intended by Duncan as a "budget" entry-level ball bearing yo-yo. Although equipped with friction stickers the yo yo will not respond if removed..
 The Flying Squirrel is an undersized plastic take-apart ball-bearing yo-yo, designed for speed and freehand play. Internal weights in the Flying Squirrel bring the sleep ability up to a regular-sized yo-yo in a smaller package. Each half comes apart with a screwdriver for weight adjustment or end-cap replacement.
 The Throwmonkey is a plastic transaxle yo-yo in a butterfly silhouette. Primarily designed for string tricks, it has over-molded rubber edges and a relatively high rim weight. Usually packaged with a "superball" counterweight for freehand tricks, as well as an instructional CD-ROM.
 The Flying Panda is a yo-yo designed for off-string tricks. It has a rubber rim instead of a traditional plastic one.

"Deluxe" models 

 The FreeHand Zero is a ball-bearing yo-yo for counterweight or regular play. It has friction stickers which if removed will prevent the yo-yo from responding.
 The FreeHand MG is Duncan's most expensive yo-yo. Its butterfly silhouette is 99.5% forged magnesium, with a ceramic ball-bearing transaxle. This yoyo is very smooth and stable. Limited quantities are manufactured each year (200 of each color). The FreeHand MG ships with an assortment of counterweights and friction stickers.
 The Freehand 2 is a ball-bearing yo-yo for counterweight or regular play. It also runs on friction stickers but the stickers are recessed allowing for less responsive play.

Discontinued models 
 The Cold Fusion was a high-end yo-yo made from aluminum with a ball-bearing transaxle and brake pads. It was, at one time, the Guinness World Record Holder for longest spin time at over ten minutes. This is another design acquired from Playmaxx and was available in both modified silhouette and butterfly (Cold Fusion GT). The Guinness record was set with a prototype butterfly version (known as the Lightspeed) that was never produced commercially but the commercial or Cold Fusion GT versions soon set new records of their own.
 The Duncan Mondial was an aluminum high end yoyo with a ball-bearing it had a unique adjustable gap system allowing you to adjust the gap by up to a hair length. Duncan acquired the design from the German company Came e Yo.
 The Ballistic was a plastic take-apart yo-yo in a traditional silhouette, with ball-bearing transaxle in a take-apart design.  Duncan's first transaxle, the Ballistic is also the most configurable, featuring ball weights that may be deployed towards the edge, to improve sleep ability, or towards the center, for improved looping. The removable endcaps and removable friction stickers are other features that may be configured.
 The Avenger is a slim, plastic yo-yo made in a rim-weighted modified silhouette with bearing transaxle.
 The Metal Zero is a FreeHand Zero, available in aluminum. Meant to be an affordable metal yo-yo, contrasted with the FreeHand MG. Available in the 40 dollar price range.
 The Duncan Professional yo-yo was originally introduced in 1971 by Duncan. In 1974, it changed shape from the tournament shape to the Slimline shape.

Screaming Eagle line 

 The Screaming Eagle line is the Duncan "elite" line with "Unresponsive" yo-yos. The yo-yos are more expensive because they are higher quality and produced in smaller batches.
 The Duncan MayheM is the signature of Zion Wilson Chambers, it is an aluminum metal yo-yo. it has a "natural" shape( Not an extreme shape).  It has an A sized ball-bearing and 13.7 mm silicone stickers for response.
 The Duncan Momentum is an aluminum metal yo-yo. it has a "natural" shape( Not an extreme shape).  It has a D sized ball-bearing and 13.7 mm silicone stickers for response. It is essentially the same as the MayheM except it has Z stacks on the side which adds quite a bit of weight and allows you to grab the yoyo while it is spinning.
 The Duncan Diversion is a more extreme shape that flattens out on the rims. It has a C sized ball bearing and 13.7 mm silicone stickers for response. It also features Freehand Zero removable plastic caps that adds quite a bit of weight and changes the style of play drastically.

References

External links 
 

Companies based in Ohio
Toy companies of the United States
Geauga County, Ohio
Yo-yos
1929 establishments in the United States
Toy companies established in 1929